Roseitalea porphyridii is a Gram-negative and strictly aerobic bacterium from the genus Roseitalea that has been isolated from the alga Porphyridium marinum in Korea.

References

External links
Type strain of Roseitalea porphyridii at BacDive -  the Bacterial Diversity Metadatabase

Phyllobacteriaceae
Bacteria described in 2017